The Banja Luka incident, on 28 February 1994, was an incident in which six Republika Srpska Air Force J-21 Jastreb single-seat light attack jets were engaged, and four of them shot down, by NATO warplanes from the United States Air Force. U.S. F-16 fighters southwest of Banja Luka, Bosnia and Herzegovina successfully engaged and destroyed several Bosnian Serb warplanes which had "attacked" a Bosnian factory, while suffering no casualties of their own. It marked the first active combat action, air-to-air or otherwise, in NATO's history.

Bombing of Novi Travnik 
In February 1994, the 526th Fighter Squadron, "Black Knights", based at Ramstein AB, Germany, was attached to the 401st Operations Group (Provisional) operating out of Aviano AB, Italy, as part of NATO's Operation Deny Flight. On 28 February, a flight of two 526th F-16s, "Knight 25" and "Knight 26", were crossing over Croatian airspace to conduct Close Air Support training near Sarajevo, Bosnia, when they detected six unidentified radar contacts eastbound in the No Fly Zone.  These contacts were not immediately visible to the NATO AWACS aircraft flying over Hungarian territory because of distance and hilly terrain.  After several minutes, AWACS was able to establish contact south of Banja Luka at 6:35 a.m. Two other 526th Squadron F-16s, Black 03 and Black 04, were vectored to the area and intercepted six J-21 Jastreb and two J-22 Orao aircraft that were bombing the "Bratstvo" military factory at Novi Travnik.

In accordance with the UN and NATO rules of engagement, orders to "land or exit the no-fly zone or be engaged" were issued twice, but both warnings were ignored. While warnings were issued, the violating aircraft dropped bombs over their target, which was left in flames. In such circumstances NATO has a "single key", meaning that only one clearance was needed, so the Combined Air Operations Center was immediately able to clear the F-16s to attack.

Air engagement 
The Bosnian Serb Jastrebs headed northwards, back to their base. At 6:45 a.m., the NATO fighters engaged their opponents. The remaining Jastrebs dropped to a few hundred metres, flying at low level to use the mountainous terrain to hide from radar and make their escape back to Udbina. Wright pressed on, closing to within AIM-9 Sidewinder range. He engaged two aircraft with heat-seeking Sidewinder missiles, shooting them both down.

After he had expended all his missiles and low on fuel, Wright handed over the chase to his wingman, Capt. Scott O'Grady, who had been flying 'top cover' above his flight leader. O'Grady dropped down to engage and fired an AIM-9M; the missile locked on and near explosion of the warhead triggered by the proximity fuse severely damaged the tail of the targeted Jastreb. Black flight was now approaching "bingo fuel", the point at which a plane will not have enough fuel to return, so they pulled off to refuel from a KC-135 Stratotanker circling in orbit over the Adriatic.

At the same time the other pair of F-16Cs, "Knight 25" and "Knight 26", had been vectored to the area by the AWACS. At 6:50 a.m., "Knight 25", piloted by Capt. Steve "Yogi" Allen, managed to get in behind a single Jastreb flying at a very low altitude. He launched a Sidewinder, downing another J-21 Jastreb. Knight 25 flight turned back hard to the south, where Knight 26, Col. John "Jace" Meyer, established radar lock on another aircraft fleeing to the northwest. After a minute of pursuit, radar contact was lost and the flight broke off the attack. Low on fuel, Knight 25 and 26 returned to the tanker over the Adriatic.  After refueling, they resumed combat air patrol over Bosnia. One remaining Serb aircraft was able to land as it ran out of fuel at Udbina Air Base in the Serbian Krajina in present-day Croatia.

The USAF credited three kills to Captain Robert Gordon "Wilbur" Wright, flying F-16C-40 #89-2137/RS, using an AIM-120 AMRAAM and two AIM-9 Sidewinders; and one kill using an AIM-9 Sidewinder to Captain Stephen L. "Yogi" Allen flying F-16C-40 #89-2009/RS of the same unit.
The Bosnian Serbs acknowledged the loss of five aircraft in the incident; the discrepancy probably stems from the fact that an additional aircraft crashed after being hit by a missile explosion while trying to escape in low-level flight.

This engagement was the first wartime action conducted by NATO forces since its formation in 1949.

Aftermath
Eight days later, on March 8, a Spanish Air Force CASA C-212 transport plane was hit in the tail by what was reported to be a Soviet-made SA-7 MANPADS missile east of Rijeka, near Serb-occupied Krajina during a flight from Zagreb to Split. The tail control surfaces were damaged, the left engine failed and four military passengers (from the US, the United Kingdom, France, and the Netherlands) were injured by shrapnel and splinters. The crew managed to land the aircraft at Rijeka Airport, and Spanish technicians were later able to repair the aircraft's damages and bring it back to service in 48 hours. The incident, which according to NATO took place in a zone under Croat control, may have been a Bosnian Serb response to the 28 February shootdowns and, though it failed to name a perpetrator, NATO labeled the incident a "provocation", while Croat defence officials blamed "Serb terrorists" and claimed that more than one missile was fired at the aircraft.

Bosnian Serb pilots 
The Bosnian Serb pilots involved in the incident were:

 Capt. 1st Class Ranko Vukmirović KIA.
 Capt. 1st Class Zvezdan Pešić KIA.
 Capt. 1st Class Goran Zarić ejected at low altitude, KIA.
 Maj. Uroš Studen ejected near Jajce, survived.
 Capt. 1st Class Zlatan Crnalić landed at Udbina Airport with his J-21 Jastreb Sr.nr. 24275 badly damaged; the aircraft later re-entered service.

See also 

Mrkonjić Grad incident

Notes

References

Further reading 
Philip Handleman, Combat in the Sky: The Art of Air Warfare, Zenith Press 2003. .

External links 
31st Fighter Wing
STING OF THE BLACK VIPER
TRIPLE OVER THE BALKANS

1994 in Bosnia and Herzegovina 
20th-century military history of the United States
History of Banja Luka
Air-to-air combat operations and battles
20th-century aircraft shootdown incidents
Aviation accidents and incidents in 1994
Aviation accidents and incidents in Bosnia and Herzegovina
Bosnian War
Combat incidents
Conflicts in 1994
History of Republika Srpska
February 1994 events in Europe
1994 disasters in Bosnia and Herzegovina